Sardis Road is a rugby union stadium situated in Pontypridd, Wales.  It is home to the Principality Premiership team, Pontypridd RFC and previously the Celtic Warriors, the now defunct regional rugby union team.  It is commonly known as the "House of Pain".

History 

Pontypridd RFC originally played their games at Taff Vale Park in Treforest, later they moved to the People's Park before finally moving to the Sardis Road ground.  It was officially opened in September 1974 and currently holds 7,861 spectators.  

It has been host to Argentina verses Western Samoa in the 1991 Rugby World Cup in which Argentina lost 12–35.

The Celtic Warriors used Sardis Road between 2003–2004, however with their demise, Pontypridd RFC have become a semi-professional club and Sardis Road has been mooted as being too big for the crowds that attend their matches.  A planning application for a retail store on the Sardis Road ground was turned down by the National Assembly for Wales.  The owners of Sardis Road, Ponty Rugby Limited had hoped to sell the ground to a property developer, Morbaine Limited.  It was envisaged that a new 3,000 seater stadium would be funded from the sale of the Sardis Road ground.

In 2009, Sardis Road hosted the Wales versus Ireland rugby league semi-final of the European Cup.

Notes

External links 
  
 Sardis Road on the official website of Pontypridd RFC

Celtic Warriors (rugby)
Rugby union stadiums in Wales
Rugby World Cup stadiums
Pontypridd
Stadiums in Wales
Pontypridd RFC
Rugby league stadiums in Wales
Sports venues completed in 1974